Leptopteromyia is a genus of robber flies in the family Asilidae. There are about seven described species in Leptopteromyia.

Species
These seven species belong to the genus Leptopteromyia:
 Leptopteromyia americana Hardy, 1947 i c g b
 Leptopteromyia brasilae Martin, 1971 c g
 Leptopteromyia colombiae Martin, 1971 c g
 Leptopteromyia gracilis Williston, 1908 c g
 Leptopteromyia lopesi Martin, 1971 c g
 Leptopteromyia mexicanae Martin, 1971 c g
 Leptopteromyia peruae Martin, 1971 c g
Data sources: i = ITIS, c = Catalogue of Life, g = GBIF, b = Bugguide.net

References

Further reading

 
 
 

Asilidae genera
Articles created by Qbugbot